Franz Handlos (born 9 December 1939 in Rusel, Bavaria, died 10 June 2013) was a German right-wing politician.

Handlos first came to prominence as member of the Christian Social Union of Bavaria (CSU), serving the party in both the Bundestag, where he represented Deggendorf, and the Landtag of Bavaria. Handlos, along with Ekkehard Voigt, represented the right of the party within the Bavarian CSU, with both men staunch critics of the leadership of Franz Josef Strauss. Handlos broke from the CSU in 1983 when Strauss agreed to accepting a major bank loan from East Germany, a move Handlos saw as accepting partition and helping to stabilise the communist state.

As a result of the split Handlos and Voigt joined with well-known political commentator and former CSU activist Franz Schönhuber to form their own party, Die Republikaner (REP) in 1983, with Handlos as the leader. Handlos saw the party as only slightly to the right of the CSU and aimed to REP as a basis to build a bundesweite (federal) version of the CSU, rather than simply concentrating on Bavaria. This view was not shared by Schönhuber, who had a more right-wing populist outlook and was inspired by the success of the French National Front. A bitter struggle for power ensued, with the radical wing winning out and in 1985 Handlos stood down as leader of the party and resigned his membership.

Handlos formed his own Freiheitlichen Volkspartei and this group contested the 1986 Bavarian Landtag elections. However the new party gained only 0.4% of the vote, leaving Handlos on the fringes.

References

1939 births
2013 deaths
The Republicans (Germany) politicians
Members of the Bundestag for Bavaria
Leaders of political parties in Germany
Members of the Landtag of Bavaria
Members of the Bundestag for the Christian Social Union in Bavaria